Mühldorf may refer to the following places:

Mühldorf, a town in Bavaria, Germany, also known as Mühldorf am Inn
Mühldorf (district), in Bavaria
Mühldorf, Carinthia, a municipality in Carinthia, Austria
Mühldorf, Lower Austria, a municipality in Lower Austria, Austria
Mühldorf bei Feldbach, a municipality in Styria, Austria